Gassaway or the alternate spellings Gasaway or Gazaway may refer to:

People
Dan Gasaway (born 1966), American politician
Nicholas Gassaway (1634–1691), Colonel of the Provincial Maryland Forces, originator of the family name
Percy Lee Gassaway (1885–1937), Congressman from Oklahoma
Charlie Gassaway (1918–1992), Major league baseball player (pitcher)
Rodney Gassaway (born September 21, 1984), Professional American mixed martial arts welterweight fighter
Henry Gassaway Davis (1823–1916), 1904 US Vice-Presidential Candidate and Senator from West Virginia
Derrick Dodd, Pen name of American humorist and poet Frank Harrison Gassaway
Victor Gazaway Willis (1876–1947), Major league baseball player nicknamed "the Georgia Peach"

Places
Gassaway, West Virginia, U.S.
Gassaway, Tennessee, U.S.